is a Japanese middle-distance runner. She competed in the 800 meters at the 2007 World Championships without reaching the semifinals. She won bronze medals at the Asian championships in 2005, 2007, 2013 and 2017.

Competition record

References

1987 births
Living people
Japanese female middle-distance runners
World Athletics Championships athletes for Japan
Japan Championships in Athletics winners